Zinaida Ignatyeva (also spelled Zinaida Ignatieva; 1 February 1938 – 23 March 2022) was a Russian pianist.

Born in Moscow, Ignatyeva was a student at the Moscow Conservatory under Samuil Feinberg, where she was awarded the VI International Chopin Piano Competition's 5th prize. Ignatyeva is a professor at the Moscow Conservatory, where she was appointed a teacher after graduating in 1962. She was active as a concert pianist within the USSR.

She was named a People's Artist of Russia.

References

External links 
 Fryderyk Chopin Information Centre
 Moscow Conservatory
 Grand Concours International de Piano de Lyon
 

1938 births
2022 deaths
Soviet classical pianists
Russian classical pianists
Soviet women pianists
Russian women pianists
Soviet music educators
Russian music educators
People's Artists of Russia
Honored Artists of the Russian Federation
Musicians from Moscow
Prize-winners of the International Chopin Piano Competition
Women classical pianists
Moscow Conservatory alumni
Academic staff of Moscow Conservatory